Värmdö Municipality (Värmdö kommun) is a municipality in Stockholm County in east central Sweden.

The municipality is named after the main island Värmdön,  in size.

The municipality in its present form was created in 1974, when "old" Värmdö was amalgamated with Gustavsberg (which had been detached from it in 1902) and Djurö.

Geography
The municipality consists of 10,000 islands, all part of Stockholm archipelago. The larger islands are Värmdö, Ingarö, Fågelbrolandet, Djurö/Vindö, Svartsö, Möja, Runmarö and Nämdö. Gustavsberg is the main town, and there are also several villages and suburbs spread out such as Djurö, Stavsnäs, Mörtnäs, Hemmesta, Brunn, Strömma and Sandhamn.

History
The name Värmdö can be traced to 1314, but it is not clear what it means. (It is likely that it comes from the word värmd, a small hot spring in the ocean which causes holes in the ice in winter, and which there are several of in the area.) The area has however been inhabited longer than that, probably from the Stone Age wherefrom remains are found. The people lived on fishing and the hunting of seals and sea birds. As the coast climate was not suitable for traditional cereal crops, the agricultural efforts were often directed towards the cultivation of potatoes.

After the introduction of steam boat lines around 1850, wealthy people in Stockholm started to build vacation houses around the stations. When today's main roads were built in the 1930s, only the steam boats serving islands remained, and the expansion continued. With the municipal reform in the 1970s, Värmdö was created through a merger between six small municipalities and adopted the coat of arms of Gustavsberg, with two porcelain ovens.

Värmdö is a rapidly expanding suburban area to Stockholm and also one of the most exclusive areas for vacation houses in Sweden. During the summer month, the population triples.

Industry
The industry of the municipality was dominated by the porcelain factory in Gustavsberg, established in the 1820s. Around the year 1900, 1,000 people were employed there, making it one of the largest working places in Sweden.

During the summer the population of the municipality triples due to the large number of tourists and vacation houses.

Demography

Population development

Residents with a foreign background
On the 31st of December 2017 the number of people with a foreign background (persons born outside of Sweden or with two parents born outside of Sweden) was 7 305, or 16.81% of the population (43 444 on the 31st of December 2017). On the 31st of December 2002 the number of residents with a foreign background was (per the same definition) 4 515, or 13.82% of the population (32 664 on the 31st of December 2002). On 31 December 2017 there were 43 444 residents in Värmdö, of which 5 683 people (13.08%) were born in a country other than Sweden. Divided by country in the table below - the Nordic countries as well as the 12 most common countries of birth outside of Sweden for Swedish residents have been included, with other countries of birth bundled together by continent by Statistics Sweden.

Transport
Värmdö is more easily accessible by water than by land. The boat service Waxholmsbolaget offers routes to various islands in the Värmdö archipelago. By land, the major road is the county road 222, a motorway from Stockholm. It ends in the ferry harbour of Stavsnäs, one of the major connection points in the Stockholm archipelago.

The municipality has no rail connection, but is served by a number of bus routes operated by Storstockholms Lokaltrafik, SL. Most buses terminate in Stockholm at Slussen. In 2018, the bus terminal was moved to a temporary terminal to the east, which has a higher capacity than the old slot.

Some of the major bus lines to Värmdö include 422 from Nacka, 425, 433, 434, and 474 from Stockholm. Bus connections have improved significantly since the addition of several routes in 2005.

Sports
The following sports clubs are in Värmdö Municipality:
 Värmdö IF
 Värmdö Hockey

Notable people
Peter Jöback
Henrik von Rehbinder
Felix Sandman

See also
 Strömma Canal

References

External links

Värmdö Municipality - Official site

 
Municipalities of Stockholm County
Metropolitan Stockholm